Ohio Community Media was an American privately owned publisher of daily and weekly newspapers, primarily in the state of Ohio. It was headquartered in the Dayton suburb of Miamisburg, Ohio, and was owned by Philadelphia-based Versa Capital Management.

History 
Most of the company's holdings comprise the Ohio core of Brown Publishing Company, a family-owned publisher based in Cincinnati that declared bankruptcy in April 2010. In September of that year, Brown's 14 Ohio dailies and about 50 weekly publications were transferred to Ohio Community Media, a new entity owned by Brown's creditors, in a transaction valued at $21.75 million.

Over the next few months, the new company sold a "mini-empire" of business newsweeklies that Brown had assembled starting in 2007, unloading titles in such far-flung cities as Charleston, South Carolina; Cheyenne, Wyoming; Fort Worth, Texas; and Naperville, Illinois.

Versa completed its purchase of Ohio Community Media for an undisclosed price in May 2011. By this point, the chain consisted of 14 daily newspapers and about 30 weeklies, all in Ohio.

In February 2012, Versa purchased Impressions Media, owner of Times Leader in Wilkes-Barre, Pennsylvania, and in May of that year it bought four Midwestern dailies formerly owned by Freedom Communications. That purchase included The Lima News in Ohio, as well as dailies in Illinois and Missouri. The four dailies acquired from Freedom were integrated into Ohio Community Media.

In 2012 Versa merged Ohio Community Media, the former Freedom papers, Impressions Media, and Heartland Publications into a new company, Civitas Media.

Holdings 
Ohio Community Media published 18 daily newspapers and about 30 weeklies (paid and free), in addition to several free weekly shopper publications. The Beavercreek News-Current, now a weekly, was formerly a daily publication.

Illinois
 Journal-Courier of Jacksonville
 The Telegraph of Alton

Missouri
 Sedalia Democrat of Sedalia
 Whiteman Warrior (weekly) of Whiteman Air Force Base

Ohio

Central Ohio (Columbus area)
 The Delaware Gazette of Delaware
 The Madison Press of London 
 Record Herald of Washington Court House
 Urbana Daily Citizen of Urbana
 Weekly newspapers:
 Mechanicsburg Telegram of Mechanicsburg
 Plain City Advocate of Plain City
 Sunbury News of Sunbury
 The Tribune of Mount Sterling
 Indian Lake Current of Russells Point and Lakeview.
 River Current of Degraff, Quincy and West Liberty.

Mid-Ohio (Mansfield area)
 Galion Inquirer of Galion
 Weekly newspapers:
 Bellville Star of Bellville
 Knox County Citizen of Fredericktown
 Morrow County Sentinel of Mount Gilead

Northwest Ohio
 The Bellevue Gazette of Bellevue
 Lake Erie Division weeklies:
 Amherst News-Times of Amherst
 The Clyde Enterprise of Clyde
 Fulton County Expositor of Wauseon
 Oberlin News Tribune of Oberlin
 The Peninsula News of Marblehead
 Swanton Enterprise of Swanton
 The Wellington Enterprise of Wellington
 The Lima News of Lima
 Putnam Voice (weekly) of Ottawa

Southern Ohio
 The Times-Gazette of Hillsboro
 Weekly newspapers:
 The News-Democrat of Georgetown
 People's Defender of West Union
 The Ripley Bee of Ripley

Western Ohio (Dayton area)
 The Daily Advocate of Greenville 
 Fairborn Daily Herald of Fairborn
 News Journal of Wilmington
 Piqua Daily Call of Piqua
 Sidney Daily News of Sidney
 Troy Daily News of Troy
 Xenia Daily Gazette of Xenia
 Times Community Newspapers weeklies:
 Beavercreek News-Current of Beavercreek
 Centerville-Washington Township Times of Centerville
 Englewood Independent of Englewood
 Enon Messenger of Enon
 Huber Heights Courier of Huber Heights
 Kettering-Oakwood Times of Kettering
 New Carlisle Sun of New Carlisle
 Springboro Sun of Springboro
 Sugarcreek Bellbrook Times of Bellbrook
 Vandalia Drummer News of Vandalia
 Weekly Record Herald of Tipp City
 Other weekly newspapers:
 Miami County Advocate of Piqua
 Register-Herald of Eaton
 Star Republican of Wilmington

References

External links 
 Ohio Community Media
 Versa Capital Management

Newspaper companies of the United States